Futz or Futz! may refer to:

Futz, a play by Rochelle Owens
Futz, a 1969 film by Tom O'Horgan based on the play
Captain Marion Futz, a fictional character in Simian Undercover Detective Squad
Futz!, a 2007 animated series